Danilo Tasić (born 15 June 1993) is a Serbian professional basketball player for SC Derby of the Prva A Liga and the ABA League.

Playing career 
Tasić played for Konstantin (Serbia), Dinamo București (Romania), AEK Larnaca (Cyprus), and Stal Ostrów Wielkopolski (Poland).

In January 2019, Tasić joined Romanian team Voluntari for the rest of the 2018–19 RNL season. On 31 August 2019, he joined Pitești for the 2019–20 season. He left Pitești in January 2020.

In January 2020, Tasić signed for Bulgarian club Levski Sofia. In February 2020, he won a Bulgarian Cup. In April 2021, he was named the Bulgarian League MVP for the 2020–21 NBL season. In May, he won the Bulgarian League Finals MVP award, helping his club to won the Bulgarian League title for the 2020–21 season with a 4–1 win over Rilski Sportist in the finals.

On 3 August 2021, Tasić signed a one-year contract with FMP. On 20 September 2022, Tasić signed a contract with SC Derby of the Prva A Liga.

References

External links 
 Player Profile at eurobasket.com
 Player Profile at realgm.com
 Player Profile at proballers.com
 Player Profile at aba-liga.com

1996 births
Living people
AEK Larnaca B.C. players
Basketball players from Niš
Basketball League of Serbia players
BC Levski Sofia players
CSO Voluntari players
CSU Pitești players
KK FMP players
OKK Konstantin players
Power forwards (basketball)
Serbian expatriate basketball people in Bulgaria
Serbian expatriate basketball people in Cyprus
Serbian expatriate basketball people in Poland
Serbian expatriate basketball people in Romania
Serbian men's basketball players
Small forwards
Stal Ostrów Wielkopolski players